Kalgeh Borun (also Romanized as Kalgeh Borūn) is a village in Dehdasht-e Gharbi Rural District, in the Central District of Kohgiluyeh County, Kohgiluyeh and Boyer-Ahmad Province, Iran. At the 2006 census, its population was 173, in 35 families.

References 

Populated places in Kohgiluyeh County